The Swan and the Wanderer is a Finnish film telling the story of two very popular Finnish singer/songwriters, Tapio Rautavaara (Tapio Liinoja) and Reino Helismaa (Martti Suosalo), who worked together until their relationship got fractious for a long time. The film covers the years from 1949 to 1965, the date of Helismaa's death.

The film also tells about the change in Finland during those years.

Cast
Tapio Liinoja as Tapio Rautavaara
Martti Suosalo as Reino Helismaa
Heikki Nousiainen as Esa Pakarinen
Ari Virta as Masa Niemi
Matti Mäntylä as Toivo Kärki
Tuija Piepponen as Siiri Angerkoski
Raimo Grönberg as Olavi Virta

External links

1999 films
1990s Finnish-language films
Finnish musical drama films
Films directed by Timo Koivusalo